Lecithocera latiola is a moth in the family Lecithoceridae first described by Kyu-Tek Park in 1999. It is found in Taiwan.

The wingspan is 17–19 mm. The forewings become broader toward the apex. The ground color is pale ochreous, with brown scales scattered sparsely beyond two thirds of the length. There are two dark-brown discal spots, a small one in the middle and a large one at end of the cell. The hindwings are grayish yellow.

Etymology
The species name is derived from the Latin latus (meaning broad) and refers to the relatively broad forewings.

References

Moths described in 1999
latiola